Carl Frederick Ekern (May 27, 1954 – August 1, 1990) was an NFL football player.

Biography
Ekern was born in Richland, Washington. He attended Fremont High School in Sunnyvale, California. Ekern was a graduate of San Jose State University and played pro football from 1976 to 1988 for the Los Angeles Rams. He appeared in the 1986 Rams promotional video, Let's Ram It, under the name of "Carl E, General of the D."

Ekern died of head injuries on August 1, 1990, when the Jeep he was driving ran off a highway near the Kern County town of Ridgecrest, California. At the time of the accident, Ekern was en route to Minden, Nevada, where he was a volunteer counselor and coach at the Rite of Passage, a camp for juvenile delinquents. The camp is located about 15 miles east of Lake Tahoe.

Carl Ekern Spirit of The Game Award
The Carl Ekern award, honoring the former Rams linebacker, is the Los Angeles Rams award
given to the player who best exemplifies sportsmanship, work ethic, and commitment to his teammates.

References

External links
NFL profile
Carl Ekern football statistics
Rite of Passage the at-risk youth camp at which Ekern volunteered

1954 births
1990 deaths
American football linebackers
San Jose State Spartans football players
Los Angeles Rams players
National Conference Pro Bowl players
Sportspeople from Sunnyvale, California
People from Richland, Washington